PCR or pcr may refer to:

Science
 Phosphocreatine, a phosphorylated creatine molecule
 Principal component regression, a statistical technique

Medicine
 Polymerase chain reaction
 COVID-19 testing, often performed using the polymerase chain reaction method
 Protein/creatinine ratio, in urine
 Pathologic complete response (pCR), in neoadjuvant therapy

Technology
 Passport Carrier Release, telecommunications software
 Peak cell rate, on ATM networks
 Platform Configuration Register, a Trusted Platform Module component
 Program clock reference, in MPEG transport streams
 Processor Control Region, a Windows data structure
 XM PCR, a satellite receiver

Political parties
 Parti Communiste Réunionnais or Communist Party of Réunion
 Partidul Comunist Român or Romanian Communist Party
 Partido Comunista Revolucionário or Revolutionary Communist Party
 Partido Cívico Renovador or Civic Renovation Party, Dominican Republic

Other uses
 Put/call ratio, in finance
 Amdo Tibetan (ISO 639 code pcr), a language
 Germán Olano Airport (IATA code PCR), Colombia
 Palestinian Center for Rapprochement between Peoples, Palestine
 Pancritical rationalism, a development of critical rationalism and panrationalism
 Paul Cruickshank Racing, an Australian motor racing team
 Police control room, an emergency control centre
 Practical Chinese Reader, a textbook
 Production control room, of a television studio
 Fallout: New Vegas PCR, regional Steam-edition of the game for gamers of Eastern Europe (probably means Polish, Czech, Russian)

See also
 Partido Comunista Revolucionario (disambiguation)